Mounts Baths is a swimming pool in Northampton, England. Built in 1936, it is notable for its Art Deco style.

It is a Grade II listed building, listed on 28 January 2013. It is regarded by Historic England as "a particularly good example of a Modern Movement swimming pool".

History
Mounts Baths was built in the 1930s, as part of a civic centre built on the site of a recently demolished prison. The civic centre also included a fire station with accommodation, and a police station and courts.

The committee overseeing the construction was chaired by Councillor W. J. Bassett-Lowke. He was interested in Modernism; the interior of his home, 78 Derngate, was remodelled in Art Deco style. A competition to design the baths was won by J. C. Prestwich & Sons of Leigh, Lancashire. It was built by A. Glenn & Son of Northampton; Sir Alexander Gibb & Partners were the engineers. Construction began in 1935, and the building was opened in October 1936.

Architecture
The front of the building is faced with ashlared Bath stone. There are large tiered windows, in reinforced concrete frames, on the sides of the pool hall, and these are supported by eight parabolic arches of reinforced concrete. Historic England comments that the interior "resembles a cathedral nave flooded with light from the tiered clerestory".

The dado around the pool hall is clad in stone-coloured faience, and the pool is clad in blue faience tiles.  Doorways on the sides of the hall are framed with Vitrolite panels. Ivory and black ceramic tiles are used in other parts of the building.

There was provision for an open-air pool, which was never built. In the 1970s a single-storey extension was added for a teaching pool.

References

Buildings and structures in Northampton
Grade II listed buildings in Northamptonshire
Swimming venues in England
Art Deco architecture in England
1936 establishments in England